Åland is represented by a single seat in the Parliament of Finland. Whilst the rest of Parliament is elected by proportional representation in multi-member constituencies, the islands have a single-member constituency., in effect making elections for Åland's representative to Parliament a first-past-the-post (FPTP) election. In the event the Åland seat becomes vacant, a replacement is chosen as in other electoral districts (using the d'Hondt method), with one key difference: if a replacement is not available, a new election for the seat must be held as soon as possible. During other elections, such as presidential elections or elections for the European Parliament, the entire country of Finland, including Åland, forms a single electoral district.

History
The Islands first gained their own seat in 1948, since when they have been represented by the Åland Coalition, an alliance formed by all major political parties in Åland to contest national elections. They usually sit with the Swedish People's Party in parliament.

List of Åland representatives

References

External links
Electoral legislation of Finland

Politics of Åland
Politics of Finland